The Northern Beaches Council is a local government area located in the Northern Beaches region of Sydney, in the state of New South Wales, Australia. The council was formed on 12 May 2016 after the amalgamation of Manly, Pittwater and Warringah Councils.

The inaugural Mayor of the Northern Beaches Council is Cr. Michael Regan, of the Your Northern Beaches Independent Team, who was first elected on 26 September 2017.

Suburbs and localities 
The following suburbs are located within Northern Beaches Council:

The following localities are located within Northern Beaches Council:

Demographics
Aboriginal and Torres Strait Islander people made up 0.6 per cent of the population; the NSW and Australian averages are 3.4 and 3.2 per cent respectively. The median age of people in Northern Beaches Council was 41 years; the national median is 38 years. Children aged 0 – 14 years made up 18.5 per cent of the population and people aged 65 years and over made up 18.2 per cent of the population. Of people in the area aged 15 years and over, 50.8 per cent were married and 37.6 per cent were not married.

At the 2021 census, 31.1% of residents stated their ancestry as Australian. 51.1% nominated a religious affiliation with Christianity, 19.7% of households speak a non-English language at home; the national average is 24.8 per cent. 81% of households only speak English at home; the national average is 72 per cent.

Council composition 
The head of the Northern Beaches Council from the proclamation was Administrator Dick Persson , who remained in office until the election of the new mayor on 26 September 2017. The first meeting of the Northern Beaches Council was held at Manly Town Hall on 19 May 2016 and from then until September 2017, the monthly council meetings cycled between the three former council chambers: Mona Vale Memorial Hall, Warringah Civic Centre in Dee Why and Manly Town Hall. Since September 2017, council meetings are held at the Civic Centre in Dee Why.

Officeholders

Current composition
The Northern Beaches Council comprises fifteen Councillors elected proportionally, with three Councillors elected in five wards. The Mayor is elected biennially by the councillors at the first meeting. The Deputy Mayor is elected annually. The most recent election was held on 4 December 2021 for a fixed three-year term of office, and the makeup of the council by order of election is as follows:

History

Early history
The traditional Aboriginal inhabitants of the land now known as the Northern Beaches were among the estimated two dozen clans around Sydney Harbour of the Dharug language group. These included the Kayamaygal and the Birrabirragal around what is now Manly to the Garigal further north and around Pittwater, peoples of the Eora nation. Within a few years of European colonisation, between 60 to 90 percent of the Indigenous peoples around Port Jackson succumbed to the deadly smallpox contagion of 1789. Much evidence of their habitation remains especially their rock etchings in Ku-ring-gai Chase National Park which borders northern beaches's north-western side. The northern beaches region was explored early on in the settlement of Sydney, only a few weeks after the arrival of the First Fleet. However, it remained a rural area for most of the 19th and early 20th centuries, with only small settlements in the valleys between headlands.

Local government history
The Municipality of Manly was first incorporated on 6 January 1877, being the first local government authority on the Northern Beaches. On 7 March 1906, the Warringah Shire was proclaimed by the NSW Government Gazette, along with 132 other new Shires. It ran roughly from Broken Bay in the north to Manly Lagoon to the south, and by Middle Harbour Creek and Cowan Creek in the west. It covered  and had a population of around 2800, with 700 dwellings. From 1951 to 1980, the Mackellar County Council operated on the Northern Beaches as an electricity and gas supplier and retailer as a joint operation of Manly Municipal Council and Warringah Shire Council. Amalgamation of Manly and Warringah councils to form one council for the Northern Beaches was recommended in the final report of the 1945–46 Clancy Royal Commission on Local Government Boundaries, but was not proceeded with in the act passed in 1948.

On 2 May 1992, The Governor of New South Wales proclaimed the establishment of the Municipality of Pittwater, the area of which roughly followed the area formerly known as 'A' Riding of the Warringah Shire. On 1 July 1993, with the enactment of a new Local Government Act 1993, the municipalities of Manly and Pittwater were renamed "Manly Council" and "Pittwater Council" and Warringah Shire Council became "Warringah Council".

Establishment of Northern Beaches Council

In 2015 a review of local government boundaries by the NSW Government Independent Pricing and Regulatory Tribunal recommended that Manly, Pittwater and Warringah merge to form one single council. The government eventually considered three proposals.

The third proposal, submitted by Warringah Council on 23 February 2016, was for an amalgamation of the Pittwater, Manly and Warringah councils. Of the 44,919 submissions lodged to the Boundaries Commission about all the local government proposals statewide, 29,189 were from Northern Beaches residents (18,977 were submitted for the third proposal); this meant that the Northern Beaches proposals made up 65% of all submissions. Former Warringah mayor, Michael Regan, noted to the Manly Daily that this was an indication of the level of interest in the Northern Beaches over the future of their local government: "given the choice of splitting the northern beaches or uniting it the community opted for unity", while former Manly mayor, Jean Hay, commented that this interest translated into the final result: "Everyone is passionate about the area and we came out and let the powers-that-be know, [...] It must have made an impact because the minister and the premier looked at what the community told them and it was the majority decision to go with a single council."

On 12 May 2016, with the release of the Local Government (Council Amalgamations) Proclamation 2016, the Northern Beaches Council was formed from Manly, Pittwater and Warringah councils. The first meeting of the Northern Beaches Council was held at Manly Town Hall on 19 May 2016. Several advisory committees were established at the council's first meeting to advise the administrator and the council on implementation matters, composed of former councillors and mayors of the three councils. These included Manly Mayor Jean Hay as Chair of the Implementation Advisory Group and Chair of the Social Committee, Warringah Mayor Michael Regan as Chair of the Economic Committee and Pittwater Deputy Mayor Kylie Ferguson as Chair of the Environment Committee. The first Council election was held on 9 September 2017, with Regan was elected as the first Mayor on 26 September 2017.

In October 2022, Northern Beaches Council was awarded the A. R. Bluett Memorial Award by Local Government NSW, which recognises the best-performing councils in the state in the previous year, with the mayor Michael Regan noting: "Since amalgamation we have had a huge focus on repairing and renewing ailing infrastructure, delivering long term financial stability and putting the community at the centre of everything we do. It hasn’t been easy but this award recognises the hard work and dedication of both the elected Council and our incredible staff to deliver great outcomes for our community." The chair of the award trustees, Les McMahon, also noted that the Council had "led its community through a number of challenges including the ongoing COVID-19 pandemic and unprecedented wet weather events. Despite the challenges, Northern Beaches Council was still able to deliver a $76 million capital works program, with a focus on resilient and sustainable infrastructure, while also undertaking a comprehensive community services program to assist all members of its community".

Heritage listings
The Northern Beaches Council has a number of heritage-listed sites, including:

In Avalon
 32 Plateau Road: Walter Burley Griffin Lodge
 111 Whale Beach Road: Loggan Rock
In Balgowlah
 83 Griffiths Street: Balgowlah Substation
In Clareville
 62 Chisholm Road: Hy Brasil (house)
In Currawong Beach
 Currawong Workers' Holiday Camp
In Killarney Heights
 Bantry Bay Explosives Depot
In Manly
 151 Darley Road: St Patrick's Seminary
 North Head Scenic Drive: North Head Quarantine Station
 West Esplanade: Manly Cove Pavilion
 West Esplanade: Manly Wharf
 34a-36 Whistler Street: Manly Substation
In Manly Vale
 near King Street: Manly Dam
In Palm Beach
 Barrenjoey Headland: Barrenjoey Head Lighthouse

Council logo
In July 2017 the new council logo was unveiled by CEO Mark Ferguson at the cost of $320,000: "It was necessary to have something that was a reflection of the Northern Beaches Council looking to the future and having it based on a strong level of community participation." The logo was developed as a result of a consultation process with community groups and council staff to ascertain a representative image for the unified council. The logo takes the form of a stylised wave made up of various images including local flora and fauna such as a humpback whale, a Norfolk pine and cabbage-tree palm, a pelican and a weedy seadragon.

See also

 Local government areas of New South Wales
List of local government areas in New South Wales

Notes

References

External links 

 Northern Beaches Council website

 
2016 establishments in Australia
Local government areas in Sydney